Kurihara is a Japanese city in Miyagi Prefecture, Japan.

Kurihara may also refer to:

 Kurihara (surname), including a list of people with the surname
 Kurihara District, Miyagi
 Kurihara Ruins, ruins of a dwelling in Nerima Ward, Tokyo, Japan

See also
Kurihara Den'en Railway Line
Kurihara Tamachi Station, in Kurihara, Miyagi